Ooni Lajodoogun was the 9th Ooni of Ife, a paramount traditional ruler of Ile Ife, the ancestral home of the Yorubas. He succeeded Ooni Lajamisan and was succeeded by  
Ooni Lafogido.

References

Oonis of Ife
Yoruba history